Rinkuškiai may refer to:

 , a village in Biržai District Municipality, Lithuania
 Rinkuškiai (brewery), a Lithuanian brewery
 , an archaeological site, Lithuania